The canton of Villaines-la-Juhel is an administrative division of the Mayenne department, northwestern France. Its borders were modified at the French canton reorganisation which came into effect in March 2015. Its seat is in Villaines-la-Juhel.

It consists of the following communes:
 
Averton
Boulay-les-Ifs
Champfrémont
Chevaigné-du-Maine
Couptrain
Courcité
Crennes-sur-Fraubée
Gesvres
Le Ham
Javron-les-Chapelles
Lignières-Orgères
Loupfougères
Madré
Neuilly-le-Vendin
La Pallu
Pré-en-Pail-Saint-Samson
Ravigny
Saint-Aignan-de-Couptrain
Saint-Aubin-du-Désert
Saint-Calais-du-Désert
Saint-Cyr-en-Pail
Saint-Germain-de-Coulamer
Saint-Mars-du-Désert
Saint-Pierre-des-Nids
Villaines-la-Juhel
Villepail

References

Cantons of Mayenne